This is a list of parties in the world that consider themselves to be upholding the principles and values of social democracy. Some of the parties are also members of the Socialist International, Party of European Socialists or the Progressive Alliance.

Names used by social democratic parties 

 Socialist Party
 Social Democratic Party
 Democratic Socialist Party
 Socialist Democratic Party
 Labour Party
 Social Democratic Union
 New Democratic Party
 Democratic Party

Alphabetical list by country

A
Albania:
Socialist Party of Albania
Socialist Movement for Integration
Social Democratic Party of Albania
Åland Islands (Finland):
Åland Social Democrats
Algeria:
Front of Socialist Forces
Andorra:
Social Democratic Party
Social Democracy and Progress
 Angola:
People's Movement for the Liberation of Angola (MPLA)
Argentina:

Frente de Todos 
Broad Front
National Alfonsinist Movement
Victory Party
Protector Political Force
Labor and Equity Party
Socialist Party
Generation for a National Encounter

Armenia:
Social Democrat Hunchakian Party
Citizen's Decision
Aruba:
People's Electoral Movement
RAIZ
Aruban Sovereignty Movement
Australia:
Australian Labor Party
Australian Greens
Austria:
Social Democratic Party of Austria (SPÖ)
Azerbaijan:
Social Democratic Party

B
Barbados:
Democratic Labour Party 
Barbados Labour Party
People's Party for Democracy and Development
Belarus:
Belarusian Social Democratic Assembly
Belarusian Social Democratic Party (Assembly)
Belarusian Social Democratic Party (People's Assembly)
Belgium:
Socialist Party (PS)
Forward
Belize:
Belize People's Front
Belize Progressive Party
Benin:
Social Democratic Party
Bolivia:
Revolutionary Left Front
Bosnia and Herzegovina:
Social Democratic Party of Bosnia and Herzegovina
Social Democrats
Democratic Front
Botswana:
Umbrella for Democratic Change:
Botswana Congress Party
Botswana National Front
Brazil:
Democratic Labour Party
Workers' Party
Brazilian Socialist Party
Green Party
Sustainability Network
Party of National Mobilization
Solidarity
Bulgaria:
BSP for Bulgaria:
Bulgarian Socialist Party
Party of Bulgarian Social Democrats
Political Movement "Social Democrats"
Alternative for Bulgarian Revival
Stand Up.BG

C
Cameroon:
Social Democratic Front
Canada:
New Democratic Party (NDP/NPD)
Parti Québécois
Chile:
Democratic Socialism:
Party for Democracy
Socialist Party of Chile
Social Democratic Radical Party
Apruebo Dignidad:
Democratic Revolution
Unir Movement
Common Force
Colombia:
Colombian Liberal Party
Historic Pact for Colombia:
Alternative Democratic Pole
Patriotic Union
Costa Rica:
National Liberation Party
Citizens' Action Party
Croatia:
Social Democratic Party of Croatia
Social Democrats
Croatian Labourists – Labour Party
New Left
Cuba:
Social Democratic Co-ordination of Cuba 
Cuban Democratic Socialist Current 
Curaçao:
Partido MAN
Curaçao is the Best
Cyprus:
Movement for Social Democracy
Czech Republic:
Czech Social Democratic Party
Party of Civic Rights

D
Democratic Republic of the Congo:
Union for Democracy and Social Progress
Denmark:
Social Democrats
Dominican Republic:
Dominican Liberation Party
Social Democratic Institutional Bloc

E
East Timor:
National Congress for Timorese Reconstruction
Frenti-Mudança
Republican Party (East Timor)
Timorese Social Democratic Action Center
Ecuador:
Democratic Left
PAIS Alliance
Egypt
Egyptian Social Democratic Party
 Estonia:
Social Democratic Party
Ethiopia:
Medrek
Social Democratic Party
European Union:
Party of European Socialists

F
Faroe Islands (Denmark):
Social Democratic Party
Fiji:
Fiji Labour Party
National Federation Party
Finland:
Social Democratic Party of Finland
France:
Socialist Party
Place Publique
Eusko Alkartasuna (Basque Country)

G
Germany:
Social Democratic Party of Germany (SPD)
Georgia:
European Socialists
Georgian Labour Party
Social Democrats for the Development of Georgia
Georgian Dream
Ghana:
National Democratic Congress
Gibraltar:
Gibraltar Socialist Labour Party
Greece:
Syriza
Movement of Democratic Socialists
PASOK – Movement for Change (PASOK-KINAL)
Agreement for the New Greece
Greenland (Denmark):
Siumut
Guatemala:
National Unity of Hope
Semilla

H
Haiti:
Struggling People's Organization
Fusion of Haitian Social Democrats
Platfòm Pitit Desalin
Hong Kong:
League of Social Democrats
Labour Party
Honduras:
Innovation and Unity Party
Democratic Unification Party
Hungary:
Hungarian Social Democratic Party
Hungarian Socialist Party
Yes Solidarity for Hungary Movement

I
Iceland:
Social Democratic Alliance
India:
Indian National Congress
Dravida Munnetra Kazhagam
Samajwadi Party
Indonesia:
Indonesian Democratic Party of Struggle
Labour Party
Indonesian Solidarity Party
Iran:
National Front
Iran Party
Organization of Iranian People's Fedaian (Majority)
Democratic Party of Iranian Kurdistan (Eastern Kurdistan)
Komala (Eastern Kurdistan)
Iraq:
Patriotic Union of Kurdistan (Kurdistan region)
Kurdistan Socialist Democratic Party (Kurdistan region)
Komala (Kurdistan region)
Ireland, Republic of:
Labour Party
Social Democrats
Israel:
Israeli Labor Party
Meretz
Italy:
Article One (Art.1)
Democratic Party (PD)
Italian Socialist Party (PSI)
Possible (Pos)
Social Democrats
Red Moors (RM) (Sardinia)
Independence Republic of Sardinia (iRS) (Sardinia)
Sicilian Socialist Party (Sicily)
Greens (South Tyrol)
Venetian Left (SV) (Veneto)

J
Japan:
Social Democratic Party
Okinawa Social Mass Party (Okinawa)
Jamaica:
People's National Party

K
Kazakhstan:
Nationwide Social Democratic Party
Kosovo:
Social Democratic Initiative
Social Democratic Party of Kosovo
Social Democratic Union 
Lëvizja Vetëvendosje! (Self-determination Movement)
Kyrgyzstan:
Ata Meken Socialist Party
Social Democrats

L
Latvia:
Social Democratic Party "Harmony"
Latvian Social Democratic Workers' Party
The Progressives
Lebanon:
Democratic Left Movement
Progressive Socialist Party
Libya:
Ensaf Movement
Lithuania:
Social Democratic Party of Lithuania
Lithuanian Regions Party
Luxembourg:
Luxembourg Socialist Workers' Party

M
Malaysia:
Democratic Action Party
Malta:
Labour Party
 Mauritius:
Labour Party
Mauritian Militant Movement
Militant Socialist Movement 
Mexico:
Party of the Democratic Revolution
Progressive Social Networks
Moldova:
European Social Democratic Party
Social Democratic Party
National Alternative Movement
People's Party of the Republic of Moldova
Mongolia:
Mongolian People's Party
Right Person Electorate Coalition
Mongolian Social Democratic Party
Montenegro:
Social Democratic Party of Montenegro
Social Democrats
Socialist People's Party of Montenegro
Morocco:
Socialist Union of Popular Forces
Myanmar:
Democratic Party for a New Society

N
Namibia:
Landless People's Movement
Nepal:
Nepali Congress
Democratic Socialist Party
People's Progressive Party
People's Freedom Party
Netherlands:
Labour Party (PvdA)
GroenLinks
New Zealand:
New Zealand Labour Party
Green Party of Aotearoa New Zealand
Nicaragua:
Sandinista Renovation Movement
Niger:
Nigerien Party for Democracy and Socialism
Social Democratic Rally
Social Democratic Party
Party for Socialism and Democracy in Niger
Nigeria:
Young Progressives Party
Labour Party
People's Redemption Party
Social Democratic Party
Northern Cyprus:
Republican Turkish Party
Communal Democracy Party
North Macedonia:
Social Democratic Union of Macedonia
New Social Democratic Party
Norway:
Labour Party

O

P
Palestine:
Fatah
Palestinian National Initiative
Panama:
Democratic Revolutionary Party
Pakistan:
Pakistan Peoples Party
Pakistan Peoples Party Workers
Qaumi Watan Party
Awami National Party
National Democratic Movement
National Party
Paraguay:
National Encounter Party
Revolutionary Febrerista Party
Progressive Democratic Party
Peru:
American Popular Revolutionary Alliance
National United Renaissance
Peruvian Nationalist Party
Philippines:
Akbayan
Philippine Democratic Socialist Party
Poland:
New Left 
Labour Union
Freedom and Equality
Polish Initiative
Social Democratic Party of Poland
Polish Left
Portugal:
Socialist Party
Puerto Rico:
Puerto Rican Independence Party

R
Republic of the Congo:
Action and Renewal Movement
Pan-African Union for Social Democracy
Congolese Party of Labour
Romania:
Social Democratic Party
Russia:
A Just Russia
Party of Russia's Rebirth
Social Democratic Party of Russia (Internationalist)
Left Socialist Action
Rwanda:
Social Party Imberakuri
Social Democratic Party

S
San Marino:
Party of Socialists and Democrats
Socialist Party
Libera San Marino
Senegal
Socialist Party
Alliance of the Forces of Progress
Serbia:
Socialist Party of Serbia
Social Democratic Party of Serbia
Democratic Party
Social Democratic Party
Party of Freedom and Justice
Movement for Reversal
League of Social Democrats of Vojvodina
Singapore:
Workers' Party of Singapore
Sint Maarten:
National Alliance
United Democrats
Slovakia:
Voice – Social Democracy
Direction – Slovak Social Democracy
Slovenia:
Social Democrats
Somalia:
Wadajir Party
Somali Labour Party
South Africa:
African National Congress
Congress of the People
United Democratic Movement
Afrikan Alliance of Social Democrats
National Freedom Party
South Korea:
Justice Party
Labor Party
Spain:
Spanish Socialist Workers' Party
Podemos
Republican Left of Catalonia (Catalonia)
Eusko Alkartasuna (Basque Country)
Sri Lanka:
Sri Lanka Freedom Party
Suriname:
National Democratic Party
Brotherhood and Unity in Politics
Surinamese Labour Party
National Party of Suriname
Progressive Reform Party
Sweden:
Swedish Social Democratic Party
Switzerland:
Social Democratic Party of Switzerland
Syria:
Syrian Democratic People's Party

T
Taiwan:
Democratic Progressive Party
Social Democratic Party
Tajikistan:
Social Democratic Party
Tanzania:
Alliance for Change and Transparency
Thailand:
Move Forward Party
Turkey:
Republican People's Party
Democratic Left Party
Peoples' Democratic Party
Tunisia:
Democratic Current
Democratic Forum for Labour and Liberties
Movement Party
Social Democratic Path

U
Uganda:
Uganda People's Congress
Ukraine:
Platform for Life and Peace
Ukraine – Forward!
United Kingdom:
Labour Party
Mec Vannin (MC) (Isle of Man) 
Mebyon Kernow (MK) (Mebyon Kernow)
Social Democratic and Labour Party (SDLP) (Northern Ireland)
Progressive Unionist Party (PUP) (Northern Ireland)
Scottish National Party (SNP) (Scotland)
Plaid Cymru (Wales)
United States:
California National Party (California)
Labor Party (South Carolina)
Movement for a People's Party
Social Democrats of America
Vermont Progressive Party (Vermont)
Working Families Party
Uruguay:
Broad Front, composed of:
Socialist Party of Uruguay
Uruguay Assembly
Vertiente Artiguista
New Space
Independent Party

V
Venezuela:
Democratic Action
For Social Democracy
Movement for Socialism
Popular Will
A New Era
Progressive Advance
Movimiento por Venezuela

W

X

Y

Z
Zambia:
Patriotic Front
Zimbabwe:
Movement for Democratic Change

List of historical social democratic parties

A
Andorra
New Democracy (Andorra)
Australia
National Labor Party

B
Belgium:
Belgian Labour Party
Belgian Socialist Party
Belgian Democratic Union

C
Canada:
Co-operative Commonwealth Federation

F
Finland
Social Democratic Union of Workers and Smallholders
France:
French Section of the Workers' International
Republican-Socialist Party
The New Democrats
Territories of Progress

G
Germany:
General German Workers' Association
Social Democratic Workers' Party of Germany

Greece:
Democratic Left (DIMAR)
Party of Democratic Socialism
Panhellenic Socialist Movement (PASOK)

Guatemala:
Revolutionary Action Party

I
Iceland:
Social Democratic Party (Iceland)
People's Alliance (Iceland)
India:
Praja Rajyam Party
Socialist Party (India)
Ireland:
Clann na Poblachta
Clann na Talmhan
National Labour Party (Ireland)
Democratic Left (Ireland)
Israel:
Mapai
Ahdut HaAvoda
Alignment
Italy:
Action Party
Italian Democratic Socialists
Italian Socialist Party
Italian Democratic Socialist Party
Democratic Party of the Left
Democrats of the Left
New Italian Socialist Party
Labour Democratic Party
Italian Reformist Socialist Party
United Socialist Party
Free and Equal

J
Japan
Japan Socialist Party
Democratic Socialist Party (Japan)
Socialist Democratic Federation (Japan)

K
Kyrgyzstan:
Social Democratic Party of Kyrgyzstan

M
Mexico
Laborist Party (Mexico)

N
Netherlands:
Social Democratic Workers' Party (Netherlands)
Democratic Socialists '70
New Zealand:
Social Democratic Party (New Zealand)
United Labour Party (New Zealand)

P
Pakistan:
Sindh National Front
Peru:
Decentralist Social Force Party
Philippines
PDP-Laban
Poland:
Social Democracy of the Republic of Poland
Polish Social Democratic Union
Democratic Left Alliance
Democratic-Social Movement

R
Romania:
National Salvation Front (Romania)
Romanian Social Democratic Party (1990–2001)

S
San Marino
Party of Democrats
Sammarinese Socialist Party
Slovakia
Party of the Democratic Left (Slovakia)
South Africa
Labour Party (South Africa)
Labour Party

T 
Trinidad and Tobago
Social Democratic Labour Party of Trinidad and Tobago
Transnistria:
Social Democratic Party of Pridnestrovie

U 
United Kingdom 
National Labour Organisation
National Socialist Party
Ukraine:
Socialist Party of Ukraine
Justice Party

Y
Yemen:
Yemeni Socialist Party

Z 
 Zimbabwe:
Movement for Democratic Change
Movement for Democratic Change – Tsvangirai
Movement for Democratic Change – Mutambara

See also 

 Social democracy
 Democratic socialism
 List of democratic socialist parties and organizations
 List of social democratic and democratic socialist parties that have governed
 Socialist International
 Progressive Alliance

References

External links 
Social Democratic Parties

Socialism-related lists
Social democracy
Democratic socialism
 
 
Social democratic
Lists of political parties